Joseph Scott Rankin-Costello (born 26 July 1999) is an English footballer who was born in Stockport and plays for Blackburn Rovers as a midfielder.

Career
Rankin-Costello started his career with Manchester United academy before moving to the Blackburn Rovers academy in 2014. He cemented his position in the U18 and U23 teams and was also a part of the squad which reached the semi finals of the FA Youth Cup. In the 2016–17 season, he made 36 appearances for the junior teams of the club. In January 2017, as a 17-year-old, he signed a professional contract with the first team, penning a deal which would keep him at the club until the summer of 2019.

On 4 October 2017, he made his senior debut against Bury where he came as a 57th minute substitute for Harrison Chapman. On 29 August 2020, Rankin-Costello scored his first professional goal in an EFL Cup tie against Doncaster Rovers. Rankin-Costello has continued to make first team appearances in the league, playing on both sides of the pitch as a full back.

Career statistics
.

References

External links 

Blackburn Rovers profile

1999 births
Living people
Association football midfielders
English footballers
Blackburn Rovers F.C. players
English Football League players